Nari Mukti Sangh (English: Women's Liberation Association) is a women's organisation in India, with a base of supporters in Bihar and Jharkhand. The organisation was founded in March 1990, during a women's conference at Talekocha in Giridih, which was held to organise women to wrestle against the exploitation, oppression and atrocities faced by them. An executive committee of the organisation was also elected at the conference. It had seven members, including its president, secretary and a treasurer. Presently, the Nari Mukti Sangh (NMS) draws considerable membership from the states of Bihar, Chhattisgarh, Jharkhand, West Bengal and Delhi.

This feminist organisation in India is not to be confused with Nari Mukti Sangh (Tangail, Bangladesh).Ideology
The organisation is influenced from "(scientific) Marxism, Leninism and Maoism", and "believes that national problems can be solved through people's struggle and on the basis of independence, democracy, equality, women's liberation and socialism." The NMS describes India as a "semi-feudal" country, and avers that "without a radical transformation of the state, women liberation is not possible."

Aims and activities
The organisation strives to generate "space to women’s voice" and motivates them to partake in "economic, political and social activity and decision making processes." The NMS's volunteers goes from village to village in Bihar and Jharkhand, and with the collaboration of local women, tries to mete out punishment to "perpetrators of sexual violence through people’s courts", and endeavours to cordially straighten out the quarrels amongst family members." It also organises "kranti ka paathshaala" (school of revolution)'' to educate women, and so far has enabled thousands of women to read and write.
Shoma Sen writes,

The NMS has become a cynosure in Jharkhand for their campaign in Pirtand forests of Giridih district to save the trees. They educate villagers about the significance of trees for humans and wildlife, and make them conscious about the possibilities of future natural disasters if the trees would be continuously cut down ignorantly. They have also alarmed to penalise the offenders with a fine of  1,000 or face physical punishment.

The NMS is believed to be a "front organisation" of the Communist Party of India (Maoist) by the Ministry of Home Affairs, and is also viewed as an arm of the Maoist Coordination Center.

See also
 Chetna Natya Manch
 Mahila Atma Raksha Samiti
 National Federation of Indian Women

References

External links
 A few words on my political life-story by Comrade Sheela, President of Nari Mukti Sangh (NMS)

Feminist organisations in India
1990 establishments in India
Socialist organisations in India